The Albanian State Police is the national police and law enforcement agency which operates throughout the Republic of Albania. The collapse of the Communist system and the establishment of political pluralism post-1991 brought important changes to the structure of the Albanian Police. The Ministry of Public Order and the General Directorate of Police were established in April 1991, and the new law of July 1991 established the Public Order Police. Nearly 80% of police manpower, i.e. personnel who had served under the previous system, were replaced by new recruits. On 4 November 1991, the Albanian Police was accepted as a member of Interpol. The emergency number is 129.

History
The original Albanian Police was founded on 13 January 1913 by the government of Ismail Qemali, Albania's first prime minister.

The crisis of 1997

Following the collapse of the Albanian economy in January–February 1997 in the wake of the implosion of the Ponzi pyramid banking schemes promoted by the government, increasing insurgency in early March led to the Police and Republican Guard deserting en masse because it became clear they were unlikely to be paid, leaving their armouries unlocked, which were promptly looted by parties unknown, believed to mostly have been the local crime bodies and self-appointed militias: many of the weapons eventually surfaced in the ethnic fighting in Kosovo. 

The resulting anarchy led a number of nations to use military forces to evacuate citizens, culminating in the UN authorising Operation Alba ("Daybreak"), a short-term military stabilisation force led by the Italian Army, tasked with facilitating the repatriation of foreigners and laying the foundations for another International Organisation to undertake the longer-term restabilisation. The political debate eventually settled in Europe within the body responsible for the defence diplomatic coordination of the Continent, the Council of the Western European Union. In a 2-hour meeting which convened at 1400 hrs on 2 May 1997, the WEU Council decided on the immediate establishment of the Multinational Advisory Police Element, sending a pathfinder officer, a Norwegian Police Colonel, the same evening.
The Italian force in Operation Alba predicated the Command structure of MAPE passing into the Italian Carabinieri, General Pietro Pistolese, previously commanding the Genoa region, bringing his team with him. Four phases followed, assessment, reconstruction, support of the Albanian Police control during the Kosovo Crisis, and finally build-down and handback in early 2001, which was somewhat accelerated ahead of the transfer of the WEU's operational responsibilities to the Council of the EU on 30 June 2001. The reconstruction principally involved the reconstruction of the Judicial system and the training of Police, but the Finance section also accommodated economic specialists acting as the principal feedback into the correction of the Judicial system. The Command Team later formed the core of the European Union Border Assistance Mission Rafah from 2005 onwards.

Public Perception 
According to a survey produced in 2009 for the United States Agency for International Development Albanian's perception of the police was as follows:

On a scale of 0–100 with 0 being Very Honest and 100 being Very Corrupt, Policemen were given a score of 63.1 points
When asked to what extent the police help to fight corruption, 0 being Not at All and 100 being Helps a Lot, the Police were given a score of 45.5
When asked about trust in institutions, 0 being No Trust at All and 100 being Trust a Lot, the Police were given a score of 47.8
When asked if during the previous year they had been asked for a bribe 7.8% said Yes
"When asked how they were treated by the police, the proportion of respondents that replied "Poorly" or "Very poorly" was 26.6%, a decrease of 10.9 percentage points from 37.5% in 2005"

Given that this was within eight years of the departure of the MAPE rebuilding mission, great concern must be expressed about the capacity of the police force to maintain the legal norms required of an aspirant EU State.

Modernization 
In 2014, the Ministry of Internal Affairs started a modernization process of the Albanian police, to modernize its equipment and methods. The first step was the acquisition of new police vans and cruisers, the next one was the installment of body cameras on police officers to improve their service and to be analysed after an operation. Uniforms of the every uniformed department of the Albanian police were overhauled and the logo was also changed.

Several operations were held from the years 2014 to 2016, in various criminally active regions of Albania (i.e. Lazarat) to restore confidence and belief of the Albanian public to support the actions of police. Body cameras are becoming an integral part of the Albanian police, used on various drug busts and high-profile operations, released afterwards to the public.

Ranks
In 2015, the State Police underwent reorganizational reforms which were expected to continue for several years. It implemented a new hierarchical structure composed of nine hierarchic ranks.

Pre-2015 ranks

Branch units

Equipment
 Glock 34
 TT-33
 Beretta 92
 Beretta PX4 Storm
 Beretta APX
 Makarov PM 
 Beretta ARX 160
 HS Produkt VHS
 Heckler & Koch MP5
 Heckler & Koch UMP
 Heckler & Koch MP7
 AK-47
 AKM
Sako TRG M10
Sako TRG-42
Heckler & Koch HK417

Vehicles
Aprilia Motorcycles
Ford Focus
Chevrolet Aveo
Volkswagen e-Golf
Hyundai Accent
Hyundai i10
Hyundai Santa Fe
BMW 5 Series
Škoda Octavia
Iveco VM 90
Land Rover Defend 4x4 Turkey has donated armored vehicles
Mil Mi-8 (air support)
Zodiac Nautic (Sea Patrol, in use by Special Police Forces)

Directors

References

See also
Law enforcement in Albania
General Directorate of Civil Emergencies
Sigurimi

Albania
Law enforcement in Albania
National Central Bureaus of Interpol